North Thompson Star/Journal is a newspaper in Barriere, British Columbia published weekly. Serving the North Thompson Valley from Heffley Creek to Blue River, the Star/Journal focuses on issues and events. North Thompson Star/Journal became a paid-distribution newspaper March 6, 2006

See also
List of newspapers in Canada

References

External links
North Thompson Star/Journal  – Official website.

Publications established in 1974
1974 establishments in British Columbia
Weekly newspapers published in British Columbia